Hard to Hit is the third solo studio album by American rapper Big Mike. It was released on May 25, 1999 via Rap-A-Lot Records, making it his final album on the label. It was produced by Mike B, Mike Dean, Mr. Lee and Sinister Sam. The album peaked at #63 on the Billboard 200 and #13 on the Top R&B/Hip-Hop Albums chart.

Track listing

Charts

References

External links

1999 albums
Big Mike albums
Rap-A-Lot Records albums
Albums produced by Mike Dean (record producer)